Anthony Appleyard (c. 1943 – 28 February 2022) worked at the University of Manchester Institute of Science and Technology, and was known as a Tolkien scholar specialising in Tolkien's constructed languages. His 1995 description of the Elvish language Quenya was the first to exploit the information published in The History of Middle-earth. This was criticised by the Tolkien scholar 
Carl F. Hostetter as trying to construct a single consistent language rather than accepting that Quenya developed, both as Tolkien continued to invent linguistic structures and in the fiction as the Elvish languages changed and fragmented.

Biography 

Appleyard worked at the University of Manchester Institute of Science and Technology.
He was a Wikipedia editor from 2004 until his death. He was an administrator of the global encyclopedia, and a member of its underwater diving project. He died in Manchester on 28 February 2022.

Tolkien scholarship

Quenya grammar 

The linguist, novelist, and Tolkien scholar Helge Fauskanger wrote that despite the attention given to Tolkien's languages, the information on the web before Fauskanger constructed his own Ardalambion website was mainly poor, with the exception of "Anthony Appleyard's work - very concentrated and technical, excellent for those who are already deep into these things, but probably difficult to absorb for beginners." 

The Tolkien scholar Carl F. Hostetter wrote that it was Appleyard, in February 1992, who made "the first comprehensive attempt ...  to systematize Quenya grammar in light of the new information published in The History of Middle-earth, particularly The Etymologies, in his article 'Quenya Grammar Reexamined'." Hostetter stated that the analysis collected together what was known of Quenya's grammar, and organised its grammatical structures "as Appleyard delineated them, in the form of paradigms assembled both from forms taken from sometimes widely separated conceptual stages of Quenya and from his own hypothetical constructions, together with not a few attempts to explain attested forms not fitting into these paradigms as errors on Tolkien's part." Hostetter commented that Appleyard's work was by 2007 useful mainly for summarising the attitudes to Tolkien's languages at that time. He characterised it as:

 seeking to label and describe a unique function for each "grammatical inflection", such as the so-called "respective case"
 seeking to "fill in gaps" that a linguist of English or Latin might expect
 seeking to avoid "(supposed) 'clashes' and 'ambiguities'"
 being willing "to reject or even ascribe to authorial error" grammatical forms that did not seem to fit in
 seeking to complete or extend the languages by creating new forms
 being willing to declare Tolkien's early words or forms "obsolete" if later forms seemed to have the same meanings
 being willing to conflate forms from different Tolkien stages when these seemed to be "useful"

Appleyard named Quenya's respective case, a grammatical case for nouns in Tolkien's constructed Elvish language of Quenya; the linguist Paul Strack describes the grammatical forms and Appleyard's proposal, stating that "There is no direct evidence supporting this theory of its use, however."

Other languages 

Appleyard wrote about Tolkien's frame story character Aelfwine of England, with analysis of Tolkien's use of Old English. Appleyard is recorded as observing that the word nazg ("ring") in the explicitly constructed language Black Speech – in the fiction, constructed by the Dark Lord Sauron, in reality by Tolkien – appeared to have been borrowed from the phrase chanana kad, meaning "ring of doom" in Tolkien's constructed language of Valarin. In 1995 he published the 19-page "Dictionaries of Middle-earth", covering the minor languages of "Danian, Old Beorian, Telerin, Ilkorin, Khuzdul, Old Noldorin, and Valarin."

Technology in Middle-earth 

Appleyard wrote, too, on the subject of "Tolkien and Space Travel", noting that Tolkien and his friend C. S. Lewis had agreed to write a pair of science fiction stories, Lewis getting space travel and Tolkien getting time travel; Appleyard suggested that Tolkien drops several hints that advanced technologies (explosives used by the Orcs at Helm's Deep, iron dragons used to assault Gondolin) were developed on Arda. He wrote that Tolkien describes Eärendil's ship that sails across the sky built "'of mithril and of elven-glass / with shining prow: no shaven oar / nor sail she bore on silver mast', and mentions no wood in its construction. This indeed sounds suspiciously like most people's image of a spaceship."

References

Sources

External links 

 Appleyard's homepage with materials on science fiction, fantasy, and scuba diving
 Helge Fauskanger's analysis of Firiel's Song, discussing some of Appleyard's linguistic suggestions

Tolkien studies
1943 births
2022 deaths